Jonathon "Jon" Fallon (born ) is a professional rugby league footballer who played in the 2000s and 2010s. He played at club level for Hull Kingston Rovers, Featherstone Rovers (Heritage № 920), and York City Knights.

Background
Jonathan Fallon was a pupil at Archbishop Thurstan school in Kingston upon Hull.

Playing career
Jonathon Fallon made his début for Featherstone Rovers on Sunday 15 February 2009.

Note
Jonathon "Jon" Fallon is occasionally misnamed as John Fallon.

References

External links
Improving York City Knights beat Gateshead in Cup
York prop Jon Fallon could miss Crusaders cup showdown
York City Knights player Fallon misses Cup tie
York City Knights take pride despite Cup defeat
York City Knights end Oldham's unbeaten record

Living people
English rugby league players
Featherstone Rovers players
Hull Kingston Rovers players
Place of birth missing (living people)
Rugby league players from Kingston upon Hull
Rugby league props
Year of birth missing (living people)
York City Knights players